Maksim Fridman was a Doctor of Science in Medicine, writer of over 60 papers in abdominal and emergency surgery, urology, purulent and battle-field surgery.

Biography
Maksim Fridman was born in Tulun, Irkutsk Governorate, into a Jewish family of Efim (Khaim) Ivanovich (Izrailevich) Fridman and Maria (Rakhil) Eduardovna Gillelson. Efim Ivanovich was  a medical doctor, zemskii medical officer, and Maria Eduardovna was a dentist. Maksim was the second child in the family and had three sisters: Sofia, Nadezhda, and Elena.

Education was the focus of the upbringing in the family, the children were raised with three governesses from England, France, and Germany, and were allowed to speak in Russian only on Sundays.

In 1919 Fridman graduated from gymnasium (school) with a silver medal (his older sister Sonia, who graduated with the gold medal, taunted him: "Maksin'ka, silver medal is only given to bitches...") and became a student of Irkutsk University, Department of Jurisprudence. The next year he transferred to the Department of Medicine.

Fridman received an M.D. in 1925.

In 1939 he married Felitsia Yakovlevna Sheinbaum (jurist and economist). In 1940 they had a son, Alik (Alexei Fridman). It was a happy marriage.

1925 - surgeon, Railroad Hospital, Innokent'evskaya station (now Irkutsk station).

1927 - ordinator, surgery clinic of Irkutsk University

1929 - surgeon, Usole Regional Hospital, Irkursk Region

1931 - Moscow Clinic (need information)

1932 - 1934 - drafted to the Red Army, senior doctor, 56th Cavalry Regiment.

1934 - surgeon, Vsehsvyatsky Ambulatory, Moscow

1935 - entered graduate school, 1st department of clinical surgery, Institute of Continuing Medical Education for Doctors

1938 - drafted to work on batter field as a surgeon, lake Khasan

1941 - Ph.D. in medicine

1941 - 1945 - surgery, Air Force Army department. During that time, developed a surgery for pilots whose fingers were frozen off (when the glass in the pit was broken, the fingers would be frozen and then amputated) with cutting into the palm and creating the ability for the pilots without fingers to hold objects.

1949 - Sci. Doctor in Medicine, dissertation "Motion points in muscles of upper extremities of human, and their practical significance".

1952 - 1973 Head of the surgery department , Kyrgyz Republic Medical Institute, now Kyrgyz State Medical Academy.

1973 - 1981 - Professor and consultant, surgery department, Kyrgyz Republic Medical Institute, now Kyrgyz State Medical Academy.

Publications
Fridman was the author of over 60 papers in abdominal and emergency surgery, urology, purulent and battlefield surgery, Fridman was doctor adviser for one Sci. Doctor, Mambet Mamakeev (:ru:Мамакеев, Мамбет Мамакеевич), and 15 Ph.D. in medicine doctors.

Interesting successful medical cases of Dr. Fridman include reviving a group of alpinists that were found after three days buried under snow avalanche by directing to transport them with heads in snow and then slowly warming while keeping heads at low temperature. The female patient died and three male patients survived. In two cases when a patient was shot in the heart during heart contraction, the pericardium filled with blood preventing expansion, and the heart stopped. Both times the patient was revived (a battlefield soldier and a crime victim).

Indexed in PubMed and MEDLINE:

Fridman ME, Kovaleva KS.,"Some data on the use of Nobel's operation in intestinal adhesions" Sov Zdravookhr Kirg. 1966 Sep-Oct;5:20-3. Russian. 

Fridman ME, Mamakeev MM, Kutmanbekov AK, Narbekov ON, "Classification of the severity of blood loss in gastroduodenal hemorrhages of peptic ulcer etiology" Zdravookhr Kirg. 1975 Nov-Dec (6):9-12. Russian. 

Fridman ME., "On some current problems of surgery of purulent diseases" Sov Zdravookhr Kirg. 1966 Mar-Apr;2:3-7. Russian.

References
 Said Mirrakhimov (Саид Миррахимов)
 Professional biography (translated) and :ru:Мамбет Мамакеевич Мамакеев#cite note-.D0.BA.D0.BD.D0.B8.D0.B3.D0.B0-5 in Russian

Soviet surgeons
Soviet military doctors
1903 births
1990 deaths